

Ša 
Šabanci, Šabančići,  Šahinovići Kiseljak, Šahmani Donji Vakuf, Šanica, Šantići Vitez (BiH), Šašići, Šatare Donji Vakuf, Šavnik Fojnica

Šć 
Šćenica Bobani (municipality Ravno), Šćipe (municipality Prozor-Rama), Šćit (municipality Prozor-Rama)

Še 
Šeherdžik Donji Vakuf, Šehovići, Šemihova, Šenkovići Novi Travnik, Šerići Jajce, Šerovina (municipality Prozor-Rama), Šešići Travnik, Ševaš Njive

Ši 
Šibenica Jajce, Šići, Šipovača Široki Brijeg, Šipovik Travnik, Šišava Travnik

Šl 
Šlimac (municipality Prozor-Rama)

Šo 
Šovšići

Šu 
Šućurići, Šudine Busovača, Šunji,  Šurmanci, Šutkovići Donji Vakuf, Šušljići Bugojno

Lists of settlements in the Federation of Bosnia and Herzegovina (A-Ž)